Ennis National School is a primary school in Ennis, County Clare, Ireland opened in 1897. It was a boys' school for 95 years before becoming co-educational in 1992.  As of the 2018-–19 school year, it has 38 individuals in its teaching staff.

The school's curriculum includes participating in "Ennis Information Age Schools", leading a poetry project. A team of pupils won the 2003 national Cadbury/NPC Challenge Quiz, out of 1,800 schools.

Development of a replacement school on a new site was finally authorised by the Government in November 2006. This followed a long campaign by parents. The new building opened in 2014.

References

External links
School website
Profile at clarelibrary.ie

Buildings and structures in Ennis
Education in Ennis
Educational institutions established in 1897
Primary schools in the Republic of Ireland
1897 establishments in Ireland